The Second Cabinet of Cyril Ramaphosa was formed on 29 May 2019 after President Ramaphosa was inaugurated for his first full-term as President of South Africa following the African National Congress's victory in the 2019 South African general election. The newly appointed ministers were inaugurated the next day by Chief Justice Mogoeng Mogoeng at the Sefako Makgatho Presidential Guest House in Pretoria. The cabinet is the third cabinet in Africa to be made completely gender-equal in its composition and the first gender-equal cabinet in South African history.

Amalgamations
The new cabinet was reduced from 36 to 28 portfolios through the amalgamation of several departments. 
The Department of Trade and Industry was combined with the Department of Economic Development. 
The Department of Higher Education and Training was combined with the Department of Science and Technology.
The Department of Environmental Affairs was combined with the Department of Forestry and Fisheries.
The Department of Agriculture was combined with the Department of Land Reform and Rural Development.
The Department of Mineral Resources was combined with the Department of Energy.
The Department of Human Settlements was combined with the Department of Water and Sanitation from 2019 and separated again in 2021.
The Department of Sports and Recreation was combined with the Department of Arts and Culture.

2021 Reshuffle
Ramaphosa reshuffled the cabinet in August 2021.

2022 motion of no confidence 
During his speech at the Debate on the State of the National Address on 14 February 2022, the Leader of the Opposition and the Leader of the Democratic Alliance, John Steenhuisen announced that he had tabled a motion of no confidence in the Cabinet in terms of Section 102(1) of the Constitution of the Republic of South Africa, 1996, excluding President Ramaphosa. On 10 March 2022, National Assembly Speaker Nosiviwe Mapisa-Nqakula announced that the debate and vote on the motion of no confidence against the Cabinet would be held on 30 March 2022. The DA requested that the vote be held by secret ballot, but Mapisa-Nqakula rejected their request on 25 March. On 30 March 2022, the motion was defeated in the National Assembly by a margin of 100 votes (131 in favour,  231 opposed and one abstention). The DA, the Economic Freedom Fighters (EFF), the United Democratic Movement (UDM), the African Transformation Movement (ATM) and the Freedom Front Plus (FF Plus) voted in favour of the motion, while the ANC, the National Freedom Party (NFP), the Inkatha Freedom Party (IFP), Good, and Al Jama-ah voted against it. This was the first time in South African history that a motion of no confidence against the cabinet occurred.

2023 reshuffle
On 6 March 2023, Ramaphosa again reshuffled his cabinet, in the aftermath of the 55th National Conference of the African National Congress at which Ramaphosa secured a second term as President of the ANC. The reshuffle included the appointment of Kgosientsho Ramokgopa as Minister in the Presidency responsible for Electricity, a post created due to the ongoing South African energy crisis.

Ministers

References

Government of South Africa
Executive branch of the government of South Africa
Cabinets of South Africa
2019 establishments in South Africa
Cabinets established in 2019
Ramaphosa